Charles William Bowerman  (22 January 1851 – 11 June 1947), often known as C. W. Bowerman, was a prominent British trade unionist and politician.

Life

Born in Honiton, Bowerman moved to Clerkenwell in London at an early age.  On leaving education, he worked as a jeweller and then a compositor.  In 1872 he briefly worked for Hour newspaper before moving to The Daily Telegraph.  He joined the London Society of Compositors in 1873 and became its General Secretary in 1892, a post he held until 1906.

In 1893, Bowerman joined the Fabian Society, and in 1897, he was elected to the Parliamentary Committee of the Trades Union Congress, the body which later became the General Council.  In 1901, was elected as a Progressive Party alderman on London County Council, a position he held until 1907.

Bowerman was the President of the TUC in 1901, and the Secretary of the Parliamentary Committee from 1911 until 1921, when he became the organisation's first General Secretary.  He retired from the post in 1923.

In 1906, Bowerman was elected as the Labour Party Member of Parliament for Deptford, a post he retained until the 1931 general election, becoming a privy councillor in 1916.

In the years following his defeat, Bowerman joined the Next Five Years Group, the council of Ruskin College and the  board of directors of the Co-operative Printing Society.

He died on 11 June 1947.

Legacy
There is a plaque commemorating Bowerman on 4 Battledean Road, a house in London N5.

References

Encyclopedia of Marxism: Glossary of People
Oxford Dictionary of National Biography

External links
 1903 photo
 

General Secretaries of the Trades Union Congress
Labour Party (UK) MPs for English constituencies
UK MPs 1906–1910
UK MPs 1910
UK MPs 1910–1918
UK MPs 1922–1923
UK MPs 1923–1924
UK MPs 1929–1931
People from Honiton
1851 births
1947 deaths
Members of London County Council
Members of the Parliamentary Committee of the Trades Union Congress
Presidents of the Trades Union Congress
Progressive Party (London) politicians
Members of the Privy Council of the United Kingdom
General Secretaries of the London Typographical Association
London Society of Compositors-sponsored MPs